Holdi may refer to several places in Estonia:
Holdi, Setomaa Parish, village in Võru Counti, Estonia
Holdi, Rõuge Parish, village in Võru County, Estonia